The 2007 Asian Women's Volleyball Championship was the fourteenth edition of the Asian Championship, a biennial international volleyball tournament organised by the Asian Volleyball Confederation (AVC) with Thailand Volleyball Association (TVA). The tournament was held in Nakhon Ratchasima, Thailand from 5 to 13 September 2007.

Venues
MCC Hall, The Mall Nakhon Ratchasima, Nakhon Ratchasima, Thailand

Pools composition
The teams are seeded based on their final ranking at the 2005 Asian Women's Volleyball Championship.

* Withdrew

Preliminary round

Pool A

|}

|}

Pool B

|}

|}

Pool C

|}

|}

Pool D

|}

|}

Classification round 
 The results and the points of the matches between the same teams that were already played during the preliminary round shall be taken into account for the classification round.

Pool E

|}

|}

Pool F

|}

|}

Pool G

|}

Pool H

|}

|}

Final round 
 The results and the points of the matches between the same teams that were already played during the previous rounds shall be taken into account for the final round.

Classification 9th–12th

|}

|}

Championship 

|}

|}

Final standing

Team Roster
Megumi Kurihara, Yoshie Takeshita, Megumi Itabashi, Miyuki Takahashi, Asako Tajimi, Sachiko Sugiyama, Kumiko Sakino, Erika Araki, Saori Kimura, Kanako Omura, Yuko Sano, Yuki Shoji
Head Coach: Shoichi Yanagimoto

Awards
MVP:  Miyuki Takahashi
Best Scorer:  Yelena Pavlova
Best Spiker:   Xue Ming
Best Blocker:  Pleumjit Thinkaow
Best Server:  Saori Kimura
Best Setter:  Nootsara Tomkom
Best Digger:  Wanna Buakaew
Best Receiver:  Yuko Sano

References
Asian Volleyball Confederation
Results

International volleyball competitions hosted by Thailand
2007 in women's volleyball
2005
Volleyball,Asian Women's Championship